Carlos Alejandro Robles Jiménez (born 11 July 2000) is a Mexican professional footballer who plays as a defender for Liga MX club Atlas.

Honours
Tampico Madero
Liga de Expansión MX: Guardianes 2020

Mexico U17
CONCACAF U-17 Championship: 2017

References

External links
 
 
 
 Carlos Robles at WhoScored

Living people
2000 births
Atlas F.C. footballers
Mexican footballers
Liga MX players
Association football defenders
Sportspeople from Tepic, Nayarit
Footballers from Nayarit